This is a list of sports clubs in the London Borough of Richmond upon Thames.

Bowling
 Barnes Bowling Club, established in 1725
Cambridge Park Bowling and Sports Club, a lawn and indoor bowls club in East Twickenham
Mid-Surrey Bowling Club, founded in 1922
North Sheen Bowling Club in Kew
Priory Park Club in Kew, which was founded in 1905
Strawberry Hill Bowling Club, founded in 1920
Teddington Bowling Club, founded in 1910

Cricket

 Barnes Cricket Club
 Barnes Common Cricket Club
 Ham and Petersham Cricket Club, established in 1815
 Hampton Hill Cricket Club, based at Bushy Park; the club also plays at Carlisle Park
Hampton Wick Royal Cricket Club, founded in 1863
 Kew Cricket Club
 The Princes Head Cricket Club, Richmond Green
 Richmond Cricket Club
 Richmond Leg Breakers Cricket Club
 Teddington Cricket Club, based in Bushy Park
 Teddington Town Cricket Club, based in Bushy Park
 Woodlawn Cricket Club, play at Carlisle Park

Football and rugby

 Barnes Eagles F.C., based at Barn Elms Playing Fields, Barnes
 Barnes Rugby Football Club, based at Barn Elms
 Hampton & Richmond Borough F.C., based at Beveree Stadium, Hampton
 Hampton & Richmond Borough Women F.C., based at Beveree Stadium, Hampton
 Harlequin Amateurs Rugby Football Club, who train and play at St Mary's University College, Twickenham
 Harlequin F.C., based at Twickenham Stoop
 Harlequin Ladies Football Club, based at Twickenham Stoop and Old Isleworthians Rugby Football Club
 Kew Park Rangers, a football club for children, based at North Sheen Recreation Ground
 London French RFC, based at based at Barn Elms Playing Fields
 London Scottish F.C., founded in 1878 and based at the Athletic Ground, Richmond
London Welsh RFC, whose ground is at Old Deer Park
 Richmond F.C., based at the Athletic Ground, Richmond
 Stonewall F.C., who play at Barn Elms Playing Fields
 Teddington Rugby F.C., based at Bushy Park

Golf

 Fulwell Golf Club
 Hampton Court Palace Golf Club, based at Hampton Court Park
 Royal Mid-Surrey Golf Club, whose course is in Old Deer Park, Richmond. The club and course were established in 1892
 Richmond Golf Club, whose course is at Sudbrook Park  in Petersham. The Grade I listed building, Sudbrook House, in the park, is now the clubhouse
 Richmond Park Golf Club
 The Stage Golfing Society, based at Richmond Golf Club
 Strawberry Hill Golf Club, whose 9-hole course was designed in 1900

Racquet sports

 Barnes Squash Club
 Ham and Petersham Lawn Tennis Club, which has courts located on the south avenue to Ham House in conjunction with Grey Court School
 Pensford Tennis Club in Kew
 Priory Park Club in Kew, which was founded in 1905
 Richmond Lawn Tennis Club
 Teddington Lawn Tennis Club in Teddington, founded in 1908
 Sheen Parks Tennis

Water sports
 Barnes Swimming Club

 Kingston Royals Dragon Boat Racing Club, based in Teddington
 Putney Town Rowing Club on Townmead Road in Kew
 Richmond Bridge Boat Club
 London Cornish Pilot Gig Club at Richmond Bridge Boathouses
 Richmond Canoe Club
 Richmond Yacht Club, based at Eel Pie Island
 Royal Canoe Club in Teddington, founded in 1866
 Richmond Sub-Aqua Club
 The Skiff Club in Teddington, founded in 1895
 Teddington Sub Aqua Club
 Teddington Swimming Club
 Thames Young Mariners, based in Ham, provides sailing, canoeing, open-water swimming and other sport and outdoor activity facilities
 Twickenham Rowing Club, founded in 1860
 Walbrook Rowing Club in Teddington

Other

 Barnes Sports Club, which has facilities for hockey, tennis, cricket, squash and personal training
 Ham and Petersham Rifle and Pistol Club, dating from 1906 or perhaps earlier, is located near Ham House, with both indoor and outdoor ranges and caters for archery, pistol and rifle shooting
 Ham Polo Club
 Kew and Ham Sports Association, which provides football and baseball facilities on the playing fields between Ham House and Thames Young Mariners
 Ranelagh Harriers,  a road running and cross-country club based in Petersham; it was founded in 1881
 Richmond Baseball and Softball Club, Ham
 Richmond Gymnastics Association, Kew
Richmond Volleyball
SIMMSport, junior sports clubs based at St Mary's University, Twickenham. The club offers four programmes: football, rugby union, athletics and gymnastics
 Thames Handball Club, Twickenham
 Royal Richmond Archery Club in Old Deer Park, Richmond, founded in 1873
 Park Lane Stables, a Riding for the Disabled Association equine facility

See also
 List of annual sports events in the London Borough of Richmond upon Thames

References

External links
Sports clubs in Richmond upon Thames
Tennis clubs in Greater London

Clubs and societies in London
Sport in the London Borough of Richmond upon Thames
Sports clubs in London
London sport-related lists